Emperor of Central Africa was the title used by Jean-Bédel Bokassa from 4 December 1976, who was crowned on 4 December 1977 in a lavish ceremony that was estimated to cost the Central African Empire US$20 million (equivalent to $ million in ). Although nominally a constitutional monarch, in practice Bokassa ruled with absolute power. For all intents and purposes, the country was still a military dictatorship, as had been the case with the Central African Republic since Bokassa took power in the 1966 coup d'état.

Bokassa I attempted to justify his actions by claiming that creating a monarchy would help Central Africa "stand out" from the rest of the continent, and earn the world's respect. The coronation consumed one third of the nation's annual budget and all of the French aid that year, but despite generous invitations, no foreign leaders attended the event. Many thought Bokassa was insane, and compared his egotistical extravagance with his contemporary – Africa's other well-known eccentric dictator, President of Uganda Idi Amin.

List of rulers

Gallery

See also
 History of the Central African Republic
 List of heads of state of the Central African Republic

References
 .

1970s in the Central African Republic
Political history of the Central African Republic
African monarchs
Positions of authority
Titles of national or ethnic leadership
Titles held only by one person